F.W. Webb Company, founded in 1866, is a wholesale distributor of engineering and construction products, such as plumbing, heating, and HVAC fixtures. It operates in the northeastern United States.

History
The company was founded in Boston in 1866 by John Stults as the city's second wholesale dealer in plumbing fixtures.  Purchased in 1933 by Roger Pope, the company is now under the third generation of Pope family ownership.

Products
F.W. Webb Company offer products and services to commercial and residential contractors as well as industrial and institutional professionals.  Core markets include plumbing, heating, HVAC, commercial refrigeration, and PVF (pipe valves fittings). The company also offers building and process controls, propane gas equipment and parts, ductwork, water systems, commercial and industrial pumps, fire protection and fabrication, thermoplastic piping, and high purity (sanitary) process components.

In addition to the wholesale trade, the company serves retail customers, contractors, and interior designers at approximately 40 Frank Webb's Bath Centers throughout the northeastern United States. These showrooms feature a range of products from different manufacturers, and include customer interaction displays configured before purchases are made, to provide immediate feedback to customers regarding design questions.

 Plumbing 
 Heating 
 HVAC 
 Refrigeration 
 Pipe, Valves & Fittings 
 Building Controls 
 Propane Gas Equipment & Parts 
 Water Systems 
 Commercial & Industrial Pumps 
 Industrial PVF Specialties 
 Fire Protection & Fabrication  
 Thermoplastic Piping  
 High Purity Process Components 
 Process Controls 
 Water Works

Sponsorships
The company is an official sponsor of the Boston Red Sox and the New York Yankees.

Facilities
 1973 – Dover, New Hampshire
 1975 – Portland, Maine
 1976 – Bangor, Maine
 1977 – Williston, Vermont
 1978 – Merrimack, New Hampshire
 1981 – Plattsburgh, New York; Claremont, New Hampshire; Northampton, Massachusetts
 1982 – Stoughton, Massachusetts; Hyannis, Massachusetts
 1983 – Windham, New York; Newport, Vermont; Glens Falls, New York
 1985 – Caribou, Maine; Biddeford, Maine; Conway, New Hampshire; Keene, New Hampshire
 1983 – Lewiston, Maine
 1986 – Albany, New York; Rutland, Vermont
 1985 – Merrimack, New Hampshire
 1986 – Haverhill, Massachusetts
 1987 – Waterville, Maine
 1988 – Sanford, Maine
 1989 – Auburn, Maine
 1989 – Scotia, New York; Laconia, New Hampshire; Bennington, Vermont; Hartford, Connecticut; Brockton, Massachusetts; Newport, Vermont
 1996 – Malden, Massachusetts; Manchester, New Hampshire; Dedham, Massachusetts; Nashua, New Hampshire; Portland, Maine; Syracuse, New York
 2000 – Cranston, Rhode Island; Portland, Maine; Hartford, Connecticut
 2003 – Waterbury, Connecticut; Concord, New Hampshire
 2004 – Amherst, New Hampshire
 2005 – Laconia, New Hampshire; Warwick, Rhode Island; Woburn, Massachusetts; Manchester, New Hampshire; Ellsworth, Maine; Franklin, Connecticut; Binghamton, New York; Torrington, Connecticut; Rockland, Maine; Woburn, Massachusetts; Gilford, New Hampshire; Augusta, Maine; Methuen, Massachusetts; Biddeford, Maine; Madison, New Hampshire
 2007—Burns Cascade Co. of Syracuse, New York
 2009—O'Connor & Senecal (OSI) of Sutton, Massachusetts
 2010—Control Equipment Corp. (CEC) of Cazenovia, New York
 2011—Sachs Plumbing Supplies of Stamford, Connecticut
 2011 – Boston, Massachusetts
 2013 – Bergen Industrial Supply of Elmwood Park, New Jersey
 2013 – Systemation Inc. of  Fairport, New York
 2014 – Allentown, Pennsylvania
 2014 – Watertown Supply
 2020 – Norwich, Connecticut

Executive officers
Jeff Pope – President
Bob Mucciarone – Chief Operating Officer
Ruth Martin – Senior Vice President of Human Resources
Michael Michaud – Senior Vice President of Information Technology
Brendan Monaghan – Senior Vice President of Operations
Jeff Thompson – Senior Vice President of Purchasing

References

Wholesalers of the United States